The 1931 United States Senate special election in Vermont took place on March 31, 1931. Republican Warren Austin was elected to the United States Senate to serve the remainder of the deceased Frank L. Greene's term, defeating Democratic candidate Stephen M. Driscoll. Austin replaced Frank C. Partridge, who was appointed to fill the seat until a special election could be held and was defeated in the special primary.

Republican primary

Results

Democratic primary

Results

General election

Results

See also
 72nd United States Congress

References

Vermont
United States Senate
Vermont 1931
Vermont 1931
1931
United States Senate 1931